Anne Queffélec (born 17 January 1948) is a French classical pianist, born in Paris.

Biography

Anne Queffélec is the daughter of Henri Queffélec and sister of Yann Queffélec, both noted writers. Her brother Hervé Queffélec is a mathematician.

She attended the Cours Hattemer, a private school. Despite an early passion for literature, she chose a life in music at a young age. She started playing piano at the age of five. In 1964, she enrolled in the Paris Conservatoire. She won the first prize for piano in 1965 and the first prize for chamber music in 1966. She continued her education with Paul Badura-Skoda and Jörg Demus, and went on to study in Vienna with Alfred Brendel. She won the first prize at the Munich competition in 1968, and in 1969, was a prize-winner at the Leeds International Piano Competition. Since then, she has enjoyed an international career.

She is not only famous as a solo concert pianist, but is also well known for her chamber music playing in cooperation with artists such as Catherine Collard, Pierre Amoyal, Frédéric Lodéon, and Imogen Cooper.

Awards

In 1990, she was awarded the French prize of Victoires de la musique classique (Soliste instrumental de l'année).

On 6 January 2004, she was made 'Officier' of l'Ordre national du Mérite.

She was promoted to 'Commandeur' de l'ordre national du Mérite on 14 November 2011.

Discography

Albums
1976: (with Alain Lombard, Orchestre philharmonique de Strasbourg) - Ravel, Les deux concertos pour piano (ERATO)
1977: Mendelssohn: Anne Queffélec, Pierre Amoyal, Frédéric Lodéon – Les Deux Trios Pour Piano, Violon & Violoncelle (ERATO)
1978: (with Pierre Amoyal) Fauré, sonates pour piano et violon (ERATO)
1979: (with Imogen Cooper) Franz Schubert, Œuvres pour piano à 4 mains (ERATO)
1988: Erik Satie
1995: Scarlatti: 13 Sonatas
1996: Dutilleux: The Works for Piano
1998: Ravel: Piano Works
1999: Schubert: Sonata D. 894; Fantasy D. 940; Sonata D. 959; Four Impromtus D.899
2000: (with Imogen Cooper) Schubert: Works for Piano Four Hands
2000: (with Catherine Collard) Satie: Works for solo piano & piano 4 hands
2001: Ravel: Piano Concertos; Debussy: Fantasie for Piano & Orchestra
2001: (with Imogen Cooper) Schubert: Piano Works for Four Hands
2002: Serenity: Satie
2002: Mozart: Anne Queffélec
2003: The works for solo piano volume 1 (EMI)
The works for solo piano volume 2 (EMI)
2004: Beethoven: Lettre à Élise
2004: Satie, Ravel: Piano Works
2004: Satie: Gnossiennes; Gymnopédies; Piano Works
2006: Haendel: Suites HWV430, 431, 433 & 436
2006: Satie: 3 Gymnopédies; 6 Gnossiennes
2007: Domenico Scarlatti, Sonate pour piano (Warner Apex)
2008: Satie: Gymnopédies; Gnossiennes; Sports and Divertissements
2009: Johann Sebastian Bach: Contemplation
2009: (with Imogen Cooper) Schubert: Piano Works for Four Hands
2009: Haydn, Sonates et variations (Mirare)
2010: Chopin, De l'enfance à la plénitude (Mirare)
2013: Satie & Compagnie
2014: Ombre et lumière D. Scarlatti 18 sonates pour clavier (Mirare MIR 265)

References

External links 
 External Biography

20th-century French women classical pianists
1948 births
Living people
Musicians from Paris
Prize-winners of the Leeds International Pianoforte Competition
Conservatoire de Paris alumni
EMI Classics and Virgin Classics artists
Virgin Classics artists
21st-century French women classical pianists
Erato Records artists